The Ohio Apportionment Board is an administrative body which draws the single-member legislative districts for the Ohio General Assembly every ten years following the census. Each of the 33 senate districts is composed of three contiguous of the 99 house of representatives district.

The board has five members:

the Governor of Ohio,
the Ohio Secretary of State,
the Ohio State Auditor,
a member selected by the Speaker of the Ohio House of Representatives and the senate leader of the same party.
a member selected by the house and senate leaders of other party.

This format ensures that no party can hold all five seats and at least one seat will belong to the minority party.

In 2011, the board's members are:

Gov. John Kasich (R)
State Auditor Dave Yost (R)
Secretary of State Jon A. Husted (R)
Assembly Republican Member: Senator Tom Niehaus (R), and
Assembly Democratic Member: Representative Armond Budish (D)

Democrats controlled the apportionment board in 1971 and 1981. Republicans controlled the apportionment board in 1991, 2001, 2011.

Government of Ohio